Jelek, Hülek or Üllő (? - before 907) was the third son of Grand Prince Árpád.
 The name might be related to the Khazar title Ilik/Ilek.

References 

Magyar tribal chieftains
House of Árpád
9th-century Hungarian people